Lagmamdha Guthi, often shortened to 'Lagma', is a Village Development Committee (VDC) in Dhanusa District in the Janakpur Zone of south-eastern Nepal. At the time of the 1991 Nepal census, it had a population of 3,726 people living in 663 individual households.

Neighborhoods
Lagma has two prominent neighborhoods commonly called Lagma East and Lagma West; the latter being divided from the former by its larger Islamic population. The major livelihoods for residents of Lagma are Fishing and Livestock; mainly the keeping of cattle animals, goats and duck.

Food

Water
Nagrain is the marketplace for most of Lagma dwellers and the surrounding VDC. Initially, Lagma depended on ponds for water. However, due to the increased supply of narrow tube wells with manual pumps, locally known as "kael". The quality of the water is somewhat improved compared to ponds. Initially, individuals collected water from the same pond for both household and drinking use, while those who do the laundry let the water drain back into the same pond. This resulted in widespread water borne diseases and children's health suffered badly. With no alternative, people continued to drink from the same dirty pond. Ponds are privately owned by so-called "Zamindars", who have financial stakes in them.

References

External links
UN map of the municipalities of Dhanusa District

Populated places in Dhanusha District